John MacKay, Mackay, or McKay may refer to:

Arts and academics
John Bain Mackay (1795–1888), nurseryman based in Clapton, London
John MacKay (journalist) (born 1967), Scottish television journalist and newscaster
John D. Mackay (1909–1970), Orcadian man of letters
John Henry Mackay (1864–1933), Scottish writer, anarchist, thinker and homosexual activist
John Victor Mackay (1891–1945), American art director
John Yule Mackay (1860–1930), Scottish anatomist and Principal of University College, Dundee
John Mackay (poet) (1656–1754), Scottish Gaelic poet known as Am Pìobaire Dall
John McKay (director), British film and television director
John McKay (mathematician) (1939-2022), mathematician at Concordia University
John McKay (musician), British guitarist and former member of Siouxsie & the Banshees
John P. McKay, American historian and professor, author of A History of Western Society
John McKay (pianist) (born 1938), Canadian-American pianist
John Sturgeon Mackay (1843–1914), Scottish mathematician

Business
John Calder Mackay (1920–2014), American real estate developer
John Mackay (industrialist) (1774–1841), ship master and industrialist in Boston, Massachusetts
John William Mackay (1831–1902), American capitalist

Military and public service
John Frederick MacKay (1873–1930), Scottish recipient of the Victoria Cross
John McKay (attorney) (born 1956), United States Attorney for the Western District of the state of Washington
John B. McKay (1922–1975), test pilot
John McKay (police officer) (1912–2004), British police inspector

Politicians
John Mackay, 11th of Strathnaver (died 1529), chief of the ancient Clan Mackay
John MacKay, Baron MacKay of Ardbrecknish (1938–2001), Scottish Conservative Member of Parliament for Argyll, 1979–1987
John George MacKay (1893–1974), farmer and political figure on Prince Edward Island
John Keiller MacKay (1888–1970), 19th Lieutenant Governor of Ontario, Canada, 1957–1963
John McKay (British politician) (1883–1964), British Labour Party MP for Wallsend, 1945–1964
John McKay (MPP) (1841–?), Ontario physician and political figure
John McKay (politician) (born 1948), member of the Canadian parliament
John McKay (New Brunswick politician) (born 1948), former Speaker of the Legislative Assembly of New Brunswick and mayor of Miramichi, New Brunswick
John McKay (Northern Ireland politician) (born 1945), member of the Northern Ireland Constitutional Convention

Sports
John Mackay (cricketer) (born 1937), Australian cricketer
John Mackay (rugby league), Australian rugby league player
 John McKay, co-founder of the Gaelic Athletic Association
John McKay (footballer, born 1898) (1898–?), Scottish footballer
John McKay (1950s footballer), Scottish football player
John McKay (American football) (1923–2001), American football coach
John McKay Jr. (born 1953), American football wide receiver

Others
John Mackay (Australian pioneer) (1839–1914), founder of the city of Mackay, Australia
John A. Mackay (1889–1983), Scottish missionary and founder of the Anglo-Peruvian School in Lima, Peru
John Calvin MacKay (1891–1986), Free Church of Scotland minister
John Ross Mackay (1915–2014), Canadian geographer

See also
Jack McKay (disambiguation)
John Mackey (disambiguation)
John Mackie (disambiguation)